Tkibuli or Tqibuli is a town in west-central Georgia of 8,620 residents (2022). located in the Imereti region at the foot of the Racha Range and the Nakerala limestone cliff, which marks the boundary of the historic region Racha. Tkibuli gained city status in 1939, and has been a coal mining centre since mining started in 1846. The city is also known for the tea that is grown in the region and sold throughout the country.

At the height of mining in the Soviet-era Tkibuli had more than 20,000 residents, but the economic disarray of the 1990s caused an exodus from the city and the mines practically halted production. Since production has resumed in 2008 by a Georgian company, the mines are a mainstay of local economy providing 2,000 people and their families the only source of income. However, the mines have become notorious for fatal accidents due to outdated equipment and inappropriate safety standards. After a series of fatal accidents, claiming 16 lives in total in 2018, mining was put on hold in late 2018 but resumed again in 2019.

References

Cities and towns in Imereti
Populated places in Tkibuli Municipality